Vukajlo is a Serbian given name, derived from the masculine given name Vuk. All the derivatives from vuk were regarded as apotropaic names. It may refer to:

Vukajlo Radonjić, Montenegrin guvernadur
Vukajlo N. Božović, Orthodox priest and revolutionary in Ibarski Kolašin, father of Grigorije Božović
Vukajlo Đukić, footballer.

See also
Vukajlović, surname

References

Serbian masculine given names